The following is a list of Nippon Professional Baseball players with the last name starting with Z, retired or active.

Z

References

External links
Japanese Baseball

 Z